Open Bay is a bay located to the south-west of Rabaul, on the northern coast  New Britain around the neck of the Gazelle Peninsula, in West New Britain Province. The bay is surrounded by the villages of Baia and Maitanakunai. During the Australian administration of the area prior to Papua New Guinea's independence, the area was exploited as a timber producing region. The Mavelo Plantation was located nearby. During the final stages of World War II, Australian forces established a defensive line across the island between Open Bay and Wide Bay, Papua New Guinea during the Battle of Wide Bay–Open Bay in 1945.

Climate
Open Bay has a tropical rainforest climate (Af) with heavy to very heavy rainfall year-round.

References

West New Britain Province
Bays of New Britain